Argonauta was the name of at least two ships of the Italian Navy and may refer to:

 , ordered by the Imperial Russian Navy and launched in 1914 as Svjatoj Georgij. Seized by Italy in 1915 and renamed Argonauta. She wad discarded in 1928.
 , an  launched in 1931 and sunk in 1940.

Italian Navy ship names